Carbon Peak, elevation , is a summit in the West Elk Mountains of Colorado. The peak is southwest of Crested Butte in the Gunnison National Forest. Carbon Peak is one of several prominent laccoliths found in the West Elk Mountains.

Geology

Carbon Peak is a laccolith, formed  when magma intruded into sedimentary strata of the Mesaverde Formation approximately 30 million years ago. Subsequent erosion has removed the softer, overlying sedimentary rock thereby exposing the more resistant igneous rock that characterizes the mountain today. The mountain is composed of quartz monzonite porphyry and granodiorite porphyry. Carbon Peak was glaciated, and the most prominent glacial cirque is located on the north side of the mountain.

Carbon Peak, along with adjacent Carbon Creek, are named after the coal (a carbon-rich rock) found in the Mesaverde Formation at the base of this and nearby laccoliths.

See also
Mountain peaks of Colorado
Mountain ranges of Colorado

References

External links
 

West Elk Mountains
Mountains of Gunnison County, Colorado
Gunnison National Forest
Mountains of Colorado
North American 3000 m summits
Tertiary igneous petrology
Laccoliths